Sea Cliff is a village located within the Town of Oyster Bay in Nassau County, on Long Island, in New York, United States. As of the 2010 United States census, the village population was 4,995.

Geography

Demographics

2010 census
As of the 2010 census the population was 92.8% White, 88% Non-Hispanic white, 2.4% African American, 0.1% Native American, 1.9% Asian, 0.02% Pacific Islander, 0.95% from other races, and 1.4% from two or more races. Hispanic or Latino of any race were 6.8% of the population.

2000 census
At the 2000 census there were 5,066 people, 2,013 households, and 1,356 families in the village. The population density was 4,655.1 people per square mile (1,794.5/km2). There were 2,082 housing units at an average density of 1,913.1 per square mile (737.5/km2).  The racial makeup of the village was 94.83% White, 1.68% African American, 0.10% Native American, 1.22% Asian, 0.02% Pacific Islander, 0.95% from other races, and 1.20% from two or more races. Hispanic or Latino of any race were 4.76%.

Of the 2,013 households 31.0% had children under the age of 18 living with them, 56.1% were married couples living together, 8.4% had a female householder with no husband present, and 32.6% were non-families. 26.6% of households were one person and 9.4% were one person aged 65 or older. The average household size was 2.50 and the average family size was 3.06.

The age distribution was 24.1% under the age of 18, 4.6% from 18 to 24, 27.9% from 25 to 44, 27.8% from 45 to 64, and 15.5% 65 or older. The median age was 42 years. For every 100 females, there were 94.7 males. For every 100 females age 18 and over, there were 91.0 males.

The median household income was $78,501 and the median family income  was $100,576. Males had a median income of $65,469 versus $41,146 for females. The per capita income for the village was $41,707. About 2.1% of families and 2.8% of the population were below the poverty line, including 0.7% of those under age 18 and 10.6% of those age 65 or over.

Government 
As of April 5, 2021, the Mayor of Sea Cliff Elena Villafane.

Education 
The village is part of the North Shore School District.

Landmarks
Several buildings in Sea Cliff, mostly Victorian houses, are listed on the National Register of Historic Places. Many of them were built as summer homes as part of Sea Cliff's late nineteenth century role as a resort town, and they have been collectively called "one of the best collections of late Victorian era architecture in Nassau County."

Properties in Sea Cliff listed on the National Register of Historic Places include:

 Central Hall
 Christ Building
 Crowell House
 House at 9 Locust Place
 House at 18 Seventeenth Avenue
 House at 19 Locust Place
 House at 58 Eighteenth Avenue
 House at 65 Twentieth Avenue
 House at 103 Roslyn Avenue
 House at 112 Sea Cliff Avenue
 House at 115 Central Avenue
 House at 137 Prospect Avenue
 House at 173 Sixteenth Avenue
 House at 176 Prospect Avenue
 House at 195 Prospect Avenue
 House at 199 Prospect Avenue
 House at 207 Carpenter Avenue
 House at 240 Sea Cliff Avenue
 House at 285 Sea Cliff Avenue
 House at 332 Franklin Avenue
 House at 362 Sea Cliff Avenue
 House at 378 Glen Avenue
 Sea Cliff Firehouse
 Sea Cliff Village Hall, Library, and Museum Complex
 St. Luke's Protestant Episcopal Church
 Stephen Harding House

Notable people 

 LaMarcus Adna Thompson – Inventor and businessman
 Alfred Lansing – Author of ''Endurance: Shackleton's Incredible Voyage
 Robert Olen Butler – Writer
 Dan Fagin – Writer 
 Natalie Portman – Actress
 Kate McKinnon – Comedian
 John Rzeznik – Frontman of the rock band Goo Goo Dolls
 Michael McKean – actor, comedian, screenwriter, and musician
 Arnold Levin – Cartoonist
 Robert Ehrlich – Businessman
 Rose Elizabeth Bird – First female Chief Justice of California
 Nini Camps – Lead singer of rock band Antigone Rising
 Kristen Henderson – Drummer of rock band Antigone Rising

References

External links

 Official website

Oyster Bay (town), New York
Villages in Nassau County, New York
Villages in New York (state)
Populated coastal places in New York (state)